Xalpatlahuac  is a city and seat of the municipality of Xalpatlahuac, in the state of Guerrero, southwestern Mexico.

Notable residents
Erasmo Catarino, a professor and a singer

References

Populated places in Guerrero